Sázava Monastery is a former Benedictine abbey and a monastery in Bohemia (Czech Republic), established by Bretislaus I, Duke of Bohemia around 1032.
It is situated some 30 km southeast of Prague, on the right bank of the eponymous Sázava river, a right tributary of the Vltava. 
The town of Sázava (Benešov District) grew around the monastery.

The monastery is notable as having followed Slavonic liturgy in the 11th century.
It was re-established under the Latin rite in 1097, until its destruction in 1421 due to the Hussite Wars. 
It was again re-established as part of the re-catholization of Bohemia under Habsburg rule in 1664, and finally dissolved in 1785.

The extant buildings mostly date to the Baroque period, with 19th-century neo-Renaissance extensions, with some remaining structures in the Gothic style of the 13th to 14th centuries, notably the unfinished three-nave Gothic basilica.

History
The monastery is the site of the hermitage of Procopius of Sázava (d. 1052), a Czech hermit (canonized in 1204 by Innocent III). Procopius attracted a community of hermits, which formed the basis of the Benedictine monastery established in 1032.
It is one of the oldest monasteries founded in the Duchy of Bohemia, established some 40 years after Břevnov Monastery.

In 1056, duke Spytihněv II had the monks expelled from the abbey. 
The monks found sanctuary in Hungary until 1061, when Duke Vratislaus II of Bohemia had them returned to the abbey. Unusually for a Benedictine abbey, Sázava was an important center of Slavic (rather than Latin) liturgy until 1096.
The first stone church, consecrated to the Holy Cross, was built in 1070. The ruins of this church have been excavated and are visible in the garden north of the monastery building.

In December 1096, the monks were expelled for the second time, by duke Bretislav II, marking the end of the Slavic rite in Bohemia. The Slavic Benedictines were replaced by Latin Benedictines from Břevnov Monastery under abbot Dědhard (d. 1133).
In the 12th century, the Romanesque basilica and monastery buildings were completed.
A 12th-century chronicle, De exordio Zazavensis monasterii, records the history of the monastery up to the year 1177.
It also contains a continuation of Cosmas of Prague down to 1162.

The monastery's founder Procopius was formally canonized in Sázava, in the presence of Ottokar, the first king of Bohemia, on 4 July 1204.

In the later 13th to 14th centuries, the Romanesque basilica was transformed into a Gothic one, intended as a monumental three-nave structure, which however remained unfinished. The monastery buildings were also rebuilt in the Gothic style.
The Madonna of Sázava is a notable 14th-century fresco in the capitular hall, unusually depicting Mary, mother of Jesus walking alongside a child Jesus aged about five years old.

Sázava was sacked by Hussite troops in 1421 and the monks were expelled, interrupting building activity.
Over the following two centuries, the monastery had secular owners and fell into decay.
In 1664, the monastery was again revived, bought by Seifert, abbot of the Břevnov and Broumov monasteries.
The dilapidated buildings were reconstructed in the Baroque style by architect Vít Václav Kaňka.

A fire in 1746 damaged the Baroque buildings, which were restored under architect Kilian Ignatius Dientzenhofer
in the late Baroque or Rococo style.
The Rococo altar with a painting of the Assumption of Mary  by Jan Petr Molitor and frescos of this period are extant.
The monastery was finally closed down by decree of Emperor Joseph II in 1785.

The monastery domain again fell to secular owners from 1809, first to Wilhelm Tiegel of Lindenkrone, who used the cloister as a chateau, while the basilica remained in operation as a parish church.
The domain was sold to Johann Friedrich Neuberg in 1869, who commissioned reconstruction work in neo-Renaissance style.
The domain and chateau were sold to Friedrich Schwarz in 1876.
Part of the domain was sold to  Benedictine monks from Emmaus Monastery in 1932, who intended to re-establish the monastery in Sázava. Benedictine monk and priest  Method Klement moved from Emmaus to Sázava in 1940 and began preparatory work, but the plan was interrupted by the outbreak of World War II and the subsequent communist regime.
The area was  managed by the National Cultural Committee of Czechoslovakia from 1951. 
In 1962, the area became a National Cultural Heritage Site, managed by the National Heritage Institute.
Archaeological excavations were carried out during the 1960s to 1990s by Ivan Borkovský, Petr Sommer, and others.
The exhibition "Old Slavic Sázava" was opened in 1983.

As part of the reprivatization following the establishment of the Czech Republic, the property was restored to Marie Hayessová, as heiress of the Schwarz family in 2003. She sold the property to the state in 2006.
Under the 2013 act on church restitution, parts of the domain were returned to the Roman Catholic parish of Černé Budy (Sázava)
and parts to Emmaus Monastery.
The National Heritage Institute remains in charge of restoration and conservation, focussing on the threatened pillars of the unfinished Gothic three-nave structure and on the restoration of the baroque frescos.

In popular culture 
Sázava Monastery is featured in the 2018 video game Kingdom Come: Deliverance, where it is called Sasau Monastery. "The Madonna of Sasau" is the name of a story arc in the game.

References

External links
klaster-sazava.cz

Benedictine monasteries in the Czech Republic
1032 establishments in Europe
Benešov District
Religious buildings and structures completed in 1032
Christian monasteries established in the 11th century